Wyatt Hill is a small ice-covered hill rising to about 500 m at the west side of Hamilton Ice Piedmont, Bear Peninsula, on the Walgreen Coast, Marie Byrd Land. Mapped by United States Geological Survey (USGS) from U.S. Navy aerial photographs taken in 1966. Named by Advisory Committee on Antarctic Names (US-ACAN) after Joseph T. Wyatt, electrical engineer, Lockheed-Georgia Company, a member of the aircraft recovery team at Dome Charlie in 1975-76 and 1976–77, which accomplished the repair and recovery of three LC-130 Hercules aircraft damaged there during January and November 1975.

Hills of Marie Byrd Land